The eastern mud turtle (Kinosternon subrubrum) or common mud turtle is a common species of turtle in the family Kinosternidae. The species is endemic to the United States. There are two recognized subspecies.

Description
The eastern mud turtle is a small and often hard to identify species. It measures  in carapace length. The carapace is keelless, lacks any pattern, and varies in color from yellowish to black. The plastron is large and double hinged, and can be yellowish to brown, and may sometimes have a dark pattern. The chin and throat are a yellowish grey, streaked and mottled with brown, while the limbs and tail are grayish. The eye, or iris, of the eastern mud turtle is yellow with dark clouding, and its feet are webbed.

Diet 
The eastern mud turtle is omnivorous and feeds on insects, crustaceans, mollusks, amphibians, carrion, and aquatic vegetation. Smaller eastern mud turtles prey on small aquatic insects, algae, and carrion, whereas larger ones can feed on any type of food

Movement 
Eastern mud turtles have been documented to migrate seasonally from uplands that they frequent to wetlands and aquatic movement in their home ranges.

Habitat 
Mud turtles (genus Kinosternon) are fresh water turtles that are found in the Southeastern and Northeastern United States. They live in rivers, lakes and swamps. Mud turtles prefer ponds that have a lot of vegetation. These animals can generally be found in spring-fed streams, and they prefer clean, oxygenated water. The Eastern mud turtle rarely basks, but in the instance they do, they will bask on rocks or debris floating on the surface of the water. In the wild, they also prefer sandy and muddy areas, as they will hibernate by burrowing into the mud. The Eastern Mud Turtle prefers hibernacula sites about 70 meters from wetlands and that have a large amount of leaf and pine litter and not too much tree cover. They will burrow at the wetland edges at a minimum depth of 1.3 cm below the soil surface to a maximum depth of 3 cm. The leaf litter helps to keep the soil moisture and the temperature consistent, while a more open canopy exposes turtles to higher temperatures before emergence.  

Mud turtles can tolerate brackish water so they may be found near salt marshes and on coastal islands.

Reproduction
Mating occurs in K. subrubrum during early spring followed by egg laying in May to early June. Clutch sizes vary from 2 to 5. Clutch size increases as female plastron length increases and they have at least 3 clutches/year.

Reproduction in this species varies greatly depending on latitudinal location. Clutches per year for this species have been reported to be one clutch per year in some states and multiple clutches in others. In a study conducted in South Carolina, clutch frequency in warmer areas averaged multiple clutches, but two clutches per year were the approximate average in cooler regions of the state. The incubation period of the eggs can range from 76 to 124 days. K. subrubrum hatchlings have a wider carapace than the width of the eggs they hatch from, indicating that the carapace unfolds immediately upon hatching.

Geographic range
The eastern mud turtle is found in the US states of Alabama, Arkansas, Delaware, Florida, Georgia, Illinois, Indiana, Kentucky, Louisiana, Maryland, Mississippi, Missouri, New Jersey, New York, North Carolina, Oklahoma, Pennsylvania, South Carolina, Tennessee, Texas, and Virginia.

In Indiana, the eastern mud turtle is listed as an endangered species.

Diseases
In 2014 on the Savannah River Site in Aiken, South Carolina the first case of ranavirus in an eastern mud turtle was detected. This virus affects amphibians, fish, and reptiles and causes oral plaque, ulceration, and conjunctivitis in infected species eventually resulting in death.

Subspecies

Two subspecies are recognized as being valid, including the nominotypical subspecies.
K. s. subrubrum  – eastern mud turtle (nominate subspecies)
K. s. hippocrepis  – Mississippi mud turtle

The former subspecies, K. s. steindachneri  – Florida mud turtle, was elevated to species status in 2013.

Nota bene: A trinomial authority in parentheses indicates that the subspecies was originally described in a genus other than Kinosternon.

References

Further reading
Behler JL, King FW (1979). The Audubon Society Field Guide to North American Reptiles and Amphibians. New York: Knopf. 742 pp. . (Kinosternon subrubrum, pp. 441–442 + Plates 318, 320, 321).
Bonnaterre PJ (1789). Tableau encyclopédique et méthodique des trois règnes de la nature, Erpétologie. Paris: Panckoucke. xxviii + 71 pp. + 66 plates. (Testudo subrubra, new species, pp. 27–28 + [turtles] Plate 5, figure 1). (in French and Latin).
Boulenger GA (1889). Catalogue of the Chelonians, Rhynchocephalians, and Crodcodiles in the British Museum (Natural History). New Edition. London: Trustees of the British Museum (Natural History). (Taylor and Francis, printers). x + 311 pp. + Plates I-III. (Cinosternon pensylvanicum, pp. 39–40).
Conant R (1975). A Field Guide to Reptiles and Amphibians of Eastern and Central North America, Second Edition. Boston: Houghton Mifflin. xviii + 429 pp. + Plates 1-48.  (hardcover),  (paperback). (Kinosternon subrubrum subrubrum, p. 43 + Plates 4, 5 + Map 13).
Goin CJ, Goin OB, Zug GR (1978). Introduction to Herpetology, Third Edition. San Francisco: W.H. Freeman. xi + 378 pp. . (Kinosternon s. subrubrum, detailed description of nesting, p. 264).
Powell R, Conant R, Collins JT (2016). Peterson Field Guide to Reptiles and Amphibians of Eastern and Central North America, Fourth Edition. Boston and New York: Houghton Mifflin Harcourt. xiv + 494 pp., 47 color plates 207 figures. . (Kinosternon subrubrum, pp. 225–227, Figure 102 + Plates 19, 21).
Smith HM, Brodie ED Jr (1982). Reptiles of North America: A Guide to Field Identification. New York: Golden Press. 240 pp. . (Kinosternon subrubrum, pp. 26–27).
Stejneger L, Barbour T (1917). A Check List of North American Amphibians and Reptiles. Cambridge, Massachusetts: Harvard University Press. 125 pp. (Kinosternon subrubrum subrubrum, p. 112).
Zim HS, Smith HM (1956). Reptiles and Amphibians: A Guide to Familiar American Species: A Golden Nature Guide. New York: Simon and Schuster. 160 pp. (Kinosternon subrubrum subrubrum, pp. 19, 23, 155).

External links
Eastern mud turtle - Kinosternon subrubrum Species account from the Towson University Reptiles of Maryland Web Page.

Kinosternon
Reptiles described in 1789